Flosi Sigurðsson (born 10 December 1960) is an Icelandic former basketball player and a former member of the Icelandic national team. He played college basketball for the University of Washington.

Basketball
Flosi started his senior team career with Fram where he played until he went to the United States to study at Capital High School in 1979. After graduating, he received offers from several prominent colleges, and eventually chose the University of Washington.

National team career
Flosi debuted with the Icelandic national team in March 1980, scoring 7 points against Armenia. In total, he played 15 games for Iceland.

Personal life
Flosi is the son of Erla Flosadóttir and former Icelandic national team player Sigurður Helgason.

References

External links
College statistics at Sports Reference

1960 births
Living people
Centers (basketball)
Flosi Sigurdsson
Flosi Sigurdsson
Icelandic expatriate basketball people in the United States
Flosi Sigurdsson
Flosi Sigurdsson
Flosi Sigurdsson